Burbank High School is a public high school in Burbank, California. It was established in 1908 and opened on September 14, 1914, and its inaugural class had 334 students. It is a part of the Burbank Unified School District. The area had previously been served by the Glendale Union High School District.

Burbank High began an extensive facility update in 2003, and its first phase of reconstruction was a building housing new classrooms for the entire school. By 2005, the campus also had a new gym, pool, visual and performing arts center, parking structure, athletic field, and tennis courts.

In addition to a core curriculum that satisfies the University of California A-G requirements, Burbank High offers 17 Honors and Advanced Placement classes, a wide variety of visual arts classes, career technical classes and nationally recognized performing arts.

History
Burbank High was first established in 1908. Previously students attended Burbank schools until the high school level, when they moved onto Glendale Union High School District. After 1908 the Burbank School District withdrew from the Glendale High School district.  The school was named after a local citizen and land donor, not the American botanist Luther Burbank.

Show Choir Program
Burbank High is known for its nationally ranked advanced mixed show choir called In Sync, directed by Brett Carroll. Also directed by Brett Carroll, is the advanced women's group, "Impressions", the advanced men's group, "Sound Dogs", and an intermediate mixed group, "Out of the Blue". The Burbank High School show choir program was recently ranked number one in the country for 2009 and 2010 and is ranked number one on another ranking list for the 2009 to 2010 season. Burbank High School hosts its own non-competitive show choir competition called Burbank Blast, intended to be held annually starting 2008; starting in 2011, Burbank Blast became a full-fledged judged competition, the first Burbank High has ever hosted. Burbank High Show choirs finished the 2010 competition season ranked in the top five overall in the nation. This marks the third straight year for this accomplishment.

Journalism
The school newspaper is titled "The Burbank Bulldog".

The students and staff also publish a yearbook, the Ceralbus. "Ceralbus" means "blue and white". In 2010, Burbank High's 2009 yearbook reached the finalist round in the National Pacemaker Award for the first time.

Speech and Debate
Burbank High School has been ranked one of the top 40 debate teams in the United States by the National Speech & Debate Association for the 2020-2021 school year; and the Harvard Debate Council's Best New School award in the Congressional Debate category. The program is notable for its success given it is one of the few national programs that do not rely on a school-provided curriculum or class, but rather alumni-based support. The program has reached the final round of the National Speech & Debate Tournament, the University of Kentucky's Tournament of Champions, and various other major tournaments, had members selected to the United States National Debate Team program, championed the California High School Speech Championship, and more.

Athletics
Burbank High School ("The Bulldogs") fields a full range of high school interscholastic athletic teams including both men's and women's basketball teams, tennis, American football, cross country, baseball, softball, golf, track and field, swimming, water-polo, volleyball, soccer, and wrestling. It competes in the California Interscholastic Federation's Southern Section as a member of the Pacific League.

Notable alumni
Mackenzie Aladjem, actress and dancer
Tajh Bellow, actor, General Hospital
Kelly Blatz, actor 
Ralph Botting, baseball player 
Rob Bowman, director, The X-Files, Elektra
Jack Burditt, TV writer
Tim Burton, director, The Nightmare Before Christmas, Batman, Beetlejuice, Edward Scissorhands  
Dove Cameron, actress
Paul Cameron, football player
Jason Chandler, baseball player 
Mark Covert, class of 1968, distance runner
Cathy Ferguson, Olympic swimmer, 2 gold medals at 1964 Tokyo Olympics
Kim Fields, actress, The Facts of Life 
Jaimee Foxworth, actress
Seychelle Gabriel, actress
Gary Grimes, actor, Summer of '42 
Blake Lively, actress, Gossip Girl, The Shallows  
Masiela Lusha, graduated at age 15, privately tutored on set of George Lopez
Chris Marquette, actor
Larry Maxam, Medal of Honor recipient for heroism during Vietnam War 
James Mouton, baseball player 
Jeff Nelson, held national high school record for two mile run 1979-2008
Evan Peters, actor
Debbie Reynolds, actress and singer, Singin' in the Rain, The Unsinkable Molly Brown, Mother
Randy Rhoads, guitarist for Quiet Riot and Ozzy Osbourne 
Theresa Russell, actress, Black Widow, The Razor's Edge, The Last Tycoon 
Freddy Sanchez, baseball player 
Lon Simmons, sportscaster
Frank Sullivan, baseball player 
Vic Tayback, actor, producer, Alice 
Matthew Timmons, actor 
Mitch Vogel, actor 
Bob Ward, strength and conditioning coach for the Dallas Cowboys. Fullerton College head track coach
Paul Ward, football player. University of Kentucky head track coach
Anson Williams, actor, producer, Happy Days
Laura Ziskin, producer, Pretty Woman, Spider-Man

In the media
The Nickelodeon TV show Victorious used digitally altered images of Burbank High School as a model of the front of Hollywood Arts, the fictional high school in which most of the series took place. The interior of the school, however, was filmed at Nickelodeon on Sunset. Also, the Disney Channel TV show A.N.T. Farm used only the front of the school as transitions between scenes.

References

External links

Burbank High School

High schools in Los Angeles County, California
High schools in the San Fernando Valley
Burbank Unified School District
Educational institutions established in 1908
Public high schools in California
1908 establishments in California
Buildings and structures in Burbank, California